Sinead Marie Dudgeon (born 9 July 1976 in Edinburgh) is a retired Scottish athlete who specialised in the 400 metres hurdles. She represented Great Britain at the 2000 Summer Olympics failing to reach the semifinals. She made the finals of the 2002 Commonwealth Games and the 2002 European Championships.

Competition record

Personal bests
Outdoor
200 metres – 23.23 (Glasgow 2000)
300 metres – 37.08 (Walnut 2001)
300 metres hurdles – 40.58 (Gold Coast 2000)
400 metres – 52.05 (Budapest 1999)
400 metres hurdles – 55.24 (Birmingham 1999)
Indoor
400 metres – 52.47 (Birmingham 2001)

References

British female sprinters
Scottish female sprinters
British female hurdlers
Scottish female hurdlers
1976 births
Living people
Olympic athletes of Great Britain
Athletes (track and field) at the 2000 Summer Olympics
Athletes (track and field) at the 2002 Commonwealth Games
Commonwealth Games competitors for Scotland
Sportspeople from Edinburgh
Universiade medalists in athletics (track and field)
Universiade bronze medalists for Great Britain
Medalists at the 1999 Summer Universiade
British Athletics Championships winners